Liceo Italo Svevo or the Istituto Italo Svevo is a private Italian international school in Cologne, Germany.

It was founded in 1997. The website states that it is the only Italian school in Germany.

See also
German international schools in Italy:
 Deutsche Schule Rom
 German School of Milan
 Deutsche Schule Genua

References

External links
  
  
  
  

Italian international schools in Germany
International schools in North Rhine–Westphalia
Schools in Cologne
1997 establishments in Germany
Educational institutions established in 1997